Frisbie Island may refer to:

 Frisbie Island (Connecticut), in the Thimble Islands
 Frisbie Island (New York), on the Delaware River